Friend of the Family (also known as Elke's Erotic Nights or simply Elke) is a 1995 erotic drama film written and directed by Edward Holzman, and starring Shauna O'Brien & Griffin Drew.

Plot
A married couple, Linda and Jeff, are trying to get their relationship under control. They do not communicate with each other much; Jeff is a workaholic and Linda thinks he is cheating on her. Linda and Jeff are both having trouble talking to Jeff's two college-aged children, Montana and Josh, from his first marriage. They then meet Elke, the younger sister of one of Linda's old friends. Elke, who is free-spirited and sexually uninhibited, begins interacting with most of the members of the family, emotionally and romantically, with a new openness and communication between them as the unexpected result.

Cast
Shauna O'Brien as Elke Taylor
Griffin Drew (credited as Annelyn Griffin Drew) as Linda Williams Stillman
Burke Morgan (credited as C.T. Miller) as Jeff Stillman
Lisa Boyle (credited as Lissa Boyle) as Montana Stillman
Will Potter as Josh Stillman
Raelyn Saalman as Laura Kellogg
Alex Demir as Ron Kellogg
Betsy Monroe as Nancy Kellogg

Reception
Friend of the Family currently has no approval rating on Rotten Tomatoes, but the Want-To-See is currently 62%. TV Guide gave the movie one out of five stars.

Sequel

In 1996, an unrelated movie called Passionate Revenge was released with Shauna O'Brien. For marketing purposes it was rebranded a sequel entitled Friend of the Family II directed by Fred Olen Ray (credited as Nicholas Medina). In this movie, Shauna O'Brien plays a femme fatale character named Linda.

References

External links

Friend of the Family at Rotten Tomatoes
Friend of the Family II at the Internet Movie Database
Friend of the Family II at Rotten Tomatoes

1995 films
American drama films
1995 drama films
1990s English-language films
1990s American films